Sebastián Ligarde (born January 26, 1954) is a Mexican-American actor and acting coach best known for his work in telenovelas and the big screen. In his four decade career he has appeared in more than 25 TV shows and over 90 films - most of them in first billing.

In 2015, Ligarde portrayed "Dr. Raimundo Acosta" in the UniMás TV series Demente Criminal, in which his former student Enrique Alejandro interpreted "Billy".

Biography
Born Amedee Gerardo Ligarde Mayaudon to Tejano-American father Amedee Ligarde Saenz, and Mexican mother Emma Armantina Mayaudon Lopez, this duo-national began his acting career in Mexico in the play Fortune and Men's Eyes in 1974. He obtained his first film role in Supervivientes de los Andes two years later. He graduated with a degree in film directing and a minor in acting from the University of Texas at Austin, and then moved to Mexico to continue his acting career. Before finding steady work in Mexico, he appeared in various USA film and television productions with Alfred Hitchcock, John Hurt, and Richard Harris.

Ligarde became known in Mexico after landing the role of Memo in the successful TV series Quinceañera in 1987. His very famous phrase "Serena Morena" has remained a public domain after two decades. From 1986 thru 2003 he remained an exclusive actor for the Mexican Television Producer Televisa. His popular roles in telenovelas such as Lo Blanco y lo Negro, Entre la Vida y la Muerte, María la del Barrio, Salomé, Tú y yo, Belinda and most recently Demente Criminal have kept him a household name. Ligarde is usually seen playing the role of a villain, degenerate, or miscreant.

He was awarded the Diosa de Plata and El Heraldo, both for Best Film Actor in El Homicida. Ligarde has also obtained four TVyNovelas Awards (Mexico's equivalent of an Emmy Award) for Pobre Juventud, Quinceañera, Entre La Vida y La Muerte, and an Honorary Award in 2002. In 2002 the League of United Latin American Citizens named him "Sr. Internacional" for his contribution to that society and as "Honorary President of the Republic of the Rio Grande" for his contributions to the state of Texas.

In 2005, Ligarde played "Gonzalo Montero", the alcoholic antagonist in Olvidarte Jamás for Venevision. He also portrayed "Alan" and "George Smith" in their TV series Mi Vida Eres Tu.

In 2006, he became the acting coach for Venevision and made a special appearance in Acorralada.

In 2007, Ligarde played the villain "Manuel" in Telemundo's Pecados Ajenos. That same year, and for Telemundo Productions, he also made two guest appearances in the TV series Decisiones.

In 2008, he played the antagonist "Santori" (a Vatican City paid hit-man) in the mini-series Gabriel. This project, made by Mega-Films, reunites him with Chayanne whom he co-starred with in their first telenovela for both actors in 1986 Pobre Juventud.

Meisner Technique Teacher
Ligarde has been teaching acting at Taller de Actuación Sebastián Ligarde since 2006 in Miami. He trains actors in film acting, and is the only known "Meisner in Spanish" teacher. After 35 years as an actor he now enjoys his own acting academy and has, for now, retired from acting.
His past students include Thalía, William Levy, Jencarlos Canela, Enrique Alejandro, Elizabeth Gutiérrez, Alejandro de la Madrid, Julián Gil, Frances Ondiviela, Daniel Elbittar, and Sissi Fleitas.

In 2015, Taller de Actuación Sebastián Ligarde will also open in Houston, Texas.

Personal life
In a 2013 interview with TVyNovelas magazine, Ligarde came out as gay, saying he has been in a stable relationship for the last 20 years. He credits performer Ricky Martin, who came out in 2010, as his inspiration.

Filmography

References

External links

1953 births
Living people
American male film actors
American gay actors
Mexican male film actors
Mexican male telenovela actors
Mexican male stage actors
People from Laredo, Texas
Mexican people of French descent
Mexican people of American descent
American male actors of Mexican descent
American people of French descent
Moody College of Communication alumni
Mexican gay actors
LGBT people from Texas
LGBT Hispanic and Latino American people
Male actors from Texas
American male telenovela actors
American emigrants to Mexico
Hispanic and Latino American male actors
Tejano people